The Kansara caste is a Hindu caste whose traditional occupation is the making of metal utensils; they inhabit the Indian states of Maharashtra and Gujarat.

Etymology
The Kansara derived their name from kan̩su.

History
During the reign of the Mughal Empire, many Kansaras moved from Gujarat to Maharashtra.

They are an urban caste.

Festivals 
They celebrate all Hindu festivals, though Navaratri and Vijayadashami are mainly focused. They arrange many cultural functions during the nine days of Navaratri and performs Shastra Puja on the tenth day, i.e., on Vijayadashami. Other important festivals are Deepawali, Raksha Bandhan, Sahasrarjun Jayanti, Kartik Ekadashi, and Nag Panchami.

Caste groups
The Kansara belongs to Gujarat, India. Their associated groups live in Maharashtra such as Tambat.

Based on their native place, Kansaras are divided into Gujarati Kansara, Maru Kansara, Sorathia Kansara, and Jamnagari Kansara, Surti Kansara. The Gujarati Kansara live in Wadhwan, Surendranagar, Rajkot, Bhavnagar, and Dhrangdhra.

People living in Gujarat, Rajasthan and Maharashtra are vegetarian.

References 

Social groups of Gujarat
Indian castes